Pinckney is an English surname. Notable people with the surname include:

Pinckney political family of South Carolina 
 Charles Pinckney (South Carolina chief justice) (1699–1758), South Carolina politician, father of Charles Cotesworth Pinckney and Thomas Pinckney, and uncle of Colonel Charles Pinckney
 Colonel Charles Pinckney (1731–1782),  South Carolina politician, British Loyalist during Revolutionary War, father of the Governor Charles Pinckney
 Charles Cotesworth Pinckney (1746–1825), Revolutionary War general and Federalist Party presidential candidate
 Charles Pinckney (governor) (1757–1824), drafter of the United States Constitution, father of Henry Laurens Pinckney, and second cousin of Charles Cotesworth Pinckney
 Eliza Lucas Pinckney (1722–1793), South Carolina planter
 Thomas Pinckney (1750–1828), South Carolina governor, ambassador to Britain, diplomat who arranged Pinckney's Treaty, and a brother of Charles Cotesworth Pinckney
 Henry L. Pinckney (1794–1863), U.S. Representative from South Carolina
 John M. Pinckney (1845–1905), U.S. Representative from Texas; his parents were from South Carolina

Others 
 Bertine Pinckney (1824–1909), American politician
 Callan Pinckney (1939–2012), American fitness professional
 Clementa C. Pinckney (1973–2015), American politician
 Darryl Pinckney (born 1953), American author and critic
 Ed Pinckney (born 1963), American basketball player
 Frank L. Pinckney (1884–1945), American college basketball coach
 John A. Pinckney (1905–1972), American prelate of the Episcopal Church
 Josephine Pinckney (1895–1957), American novelist and poet
 Michael Pinckney (born 1998), American football player
 Scott Pinckney (born 1989), American professional golfer
 St. Clair Pinckney (1930–1999), American saxophonist
 Violet Pinckney (1871–1955), English tennis player

See also
 Charles Pinckney (disambiguation)
 Governor Pinckney (disambiguation)
 Senator Pinckney (disambiguation)
 Pinckney (disambiguation)